G. K. Surya Prakash (born 1953) is a professor of Chemistry, Chemical Engineering and Materials Science and holder of the George A. and Judith A. Olah Nobel Laureate Chair in Hydrocarbon Chemistry at the Department of Chemistry at the University of Southern California. He serves as the Director of the Loker Hydrocarbon Research Institute, where he maintains his prominent research lab. He also served as the Chairman of the Chemistry Department for four years between 2017-2021. He received a B.Sc. (Hons) from Bangalore University in 1972, a M.Sc. from IIT Madras in 1974 and a Ph.D. from University of Southern California in 1978 under the direction of George Olah, where he worked on characterizing stable carbocations in superacids. He also sits on several editorial boards of major scientific journals.

Research 
Dr. Prakash is a prolific researcher with over 835 peer-reviewed publications that have been cited by over 49,000 times. and co-author of many edited books and monographs. He also holds ~115 patents and has been generating headlines as a co-proponent of the methanol economy concept alongside the late Nobel Laureate George Olah.  The Methanol Economy aims to capture and recycle carbon dioxide from the atmosphere leading to convenient drop-in fuels and chemical feedstocks to replace fossil fuels. He co-developed the Direct Methanol Fuel Cell (DMFC) with collaborators from NASA-JPL.  He introduced and developed trifluoromethyltrimethylsilane as a trifluoromethylating reagent in organic chemistry and it is sometimes referred to as the Ruppert-Prakash reagent. His group's current research interests cover a wide range of subjects in the area of selective fluorinations, fluoroalkylations, oxidations, energetic materials, reductions, stereoselective reactions, electrochemical synthesis, hydrocarbon activation and isomerization, anthropogenic CO2 based fuels and feed-stocks, direct oxidation fuel cells, lithium ion battery electrolytes, iron batteries, flow batteries, electrochemistry, polymer chemistry, superacid catalyzed reactions, stable carbocation chemistry, application of ab initio and DFT theory and NMR chemical shift calculations. His coauthored book with G. A.Olah and A. Goeppert on solving the carbon conundrum, Beyond Oil and Gas: The Methanol Economy (translated into Chinese, Swedish, Hungarian, Japanese and Russian), Wiley VCH (published in three editions, 2006, 2009 and 2018) is getting increasing attention and adoption world-wide.

Awards 
Dr. Prakash has received many awards and accolades. He is a recipient of three American Chemical Society National Awards (2004, 2006, and 2018) and in 2011 was  elected a fellow of the European Academy of Sciences for his contribution towards the methanol economy. He co-shared (with G. A. Olah) the $1M Samson Prime Minister's Prize for Innovation in Alternative Fuels for Transportation from the State of Israel in 2013. His work in fluorine chemistry was recognized by the Henri Moissan Prize from the Fondation de la Maison de la Chimie in France in 2015.

List of major awards and recognition 
Phi Kappa Phi Faculty Recognition Award for Research and Scholarship, 1986
USC Endowed Chair, George A. and Judith A. Olah Nobel Laureate Chair in Hydrocarbon Chemistry, 1/1/1997-present
JPL/TAP Group Achievement Award for Low Crossover Membranes for Methanol Fuel Cells, 1998
USC Associates Award For Creativity In Research And Scholarship, 2000
American Chemical Society Award for Creative Work in Fluorine Chemistry, 2004
NASA Space Act Board Award, New Fuels For Direct Oxidation Fuel Cells, 2004
Corresponding Member, European Academy of Arts, Sciences and Humanities, 2004
Fellow of the American Association of Advancement of Science , 2005
American Chemical Society George A. Olah Award in Hydrocarbon or Petroleum Chemistry, 2006
Richard C. Tolman Award, Southern California Section of American Chemical Society, 2006
George A. Olah Annual Lecturer, University of Southern California, 2006 
Distinguished Alumnus Award, Indian Institute of Technology, Madras, India, 2007
Professor K. Venkataraman Lecturer, University Department of Chemical Technology, University of Mumbai, India, 2008
CRSI Medal, Chemical Research Society of India, 2010
Burgenstock Lecturer, 2010
Fellow of the European Academy of Sciences, 2012
USC Raubenheimer Outstanding Senior Faculty Award, For Exemplary Contributions in the Areas of Teaching, Research and Service, 2011
Mellon Mentoring Award (Post Doctoral), University of Southern California, 2012   
Eric and Sheila Samson Prime Minister's Prize for Alternative Fuels to Transportation from the State of Israel, 2013
The National Academy of Sciences, India (NASI) Foreign Fellow, 2013
Fellow of the American Chemical Society (ACS Fellow), 2014
ASEI Scientist of the Year, Chemistry & Chemical Engineering, American Association of Engineers of Indian Origin, 2014
Henri Moissan Prize for excellence in Fluorine Chemistry, Fondation de la Maison de la Chimie, 2015
19th Charles Reed Endowed Lecturer, Rensselaer Polytechnic Institute, 2016    
American Chemical Society Arthur C. Cope Late Scholars Award for excellence in Organic Chemistry, 2018

References 

1953 births
Living people
20th-century Indian chemists